The Odra is a river in Spain. Its springs are located to the north of Amaya mountain in the province of Burgos, from where it flows southward until reaching the Pisuerga River. The main tributary is the Brullés River.

See also 
 List of rivers of Spain

Rivers of Spain
Rivers of Castile and León
Rivers of Burgos
Tributaries of the Pisuerga